Frank Gerster (born 15 April 1976) is a German football manager and former footballer who played as a midfielder. He is currently the manager of FC Neu-Anspach.

Career
Gerster played youth football in Bavaria, playing for his hometown club FC Kempten and later FC Augsburg, before joining Bayern Munich in 1994. He progressed through Bayern's reserve team, and was promoted to the first team in 1996, making his Bundesliga in March 1997 as a substitute for Marcel Witeczek in a 2–0 defeat to Arminia Bielefeld. He made a further eight appearances for Bayern - all as a substitute - seven came in the League and one against IFK Göteborg in the group stage of the 1997–98 UEFA Champions League. During his time at Bayern, Gerster won a League title and a Cup and also represented Germany, being named in the squad for the 1995 FIFA World Youth Championship in Qatar, and making fourteen appearances for the Germany under-21 team.

In 1998, Gerster left Bayern to sign for Eintracht Frankfurt, where he had a hugely unsuccessful three years, making only one first-team appearance, in a 4–1 defeat to 1860 Munich. After leaving Frankfurt, Gerster embarked on a journeyman career, playing for various Regionalliga clubs before retiring in 2009 after a year with Chemnitzer FC. A year later, he was appointed as assistant manager of Borussia Dortmund's reserve team, assisting David Wagner.

Honours
 Bundesliga: 1996–97
 DFB-Ligapokal: 1997
 DFB-Pokal: 1997–98

References

External links
 

1976 births
Living people
German footballers
Germany under-21 international footballers
Germany youth international footballers
Association football midfielders
FC Bayern Munich II players
FC Bayern Munich footballers
Eintracht Frankfurt players
SSV Reutlingen 05 players
FC Sachsen Leipzig players
1. FC Magdeburg players
Chemnitzer FC players
FC Augsburg players
Kickers Emden players
Bundesliga players
2. Bundesliga players
Footballers from Bavaria